Ceroxys baneai is a species of picture-winged fly in the genus Ceroxys of the family Ulidiidae found in

Distribution
Romania.

References

baneai
Insects described in 1994
Diptera of Europe